Waterloo Road is a British school-based television drama series that was originally broadcast in the United Kingdom between 9 March 2006 and 9 March 2015, and later revived in a new series that began airing on 3 January 2023.

Transmissions 

The show is set in a failing comprehensive school of the same name and focuses on both the professional and personal lives of the students and staff. The show was initially filmed on a former primary school site in Kirkholt, Rochdale, before moving production to a former secondary school site in Greenock, Scotland for series eight to ten. The revival series returned to Greater Manchester, with filming at the former St Ambrose Barlow Roman Catholic High School in Swinton.

Original show 
The show ran for ten series with 200 hour-long episodes in its initial run. The first series contained eight episodes, which was increased to twelve for the second series. The third series saw an increase to twenty episodes, which continued until series seven when the show increased its output to thirty episodes.

The show's move to Scotland established a commitment to making fifty episodes of the drama, which aired over series eight and nine. A further twenty episodes were then commissioned as part of the show's tenth series.

The majority of the drama was first broadcast on BBC One in a primetime 8pm timeslot, originally on a Thursday night before later moving to a Wednesday night. However, the final ten episodes of the show were premiered on BBC Three in an 8.30 pm timeslot, with a repeat airing later that evening, at 10.35 pm, on BBC One. The decision was made to allow new programming to air in the timeslot.

Waterloo Road was cancelled in 2014 after BBC executives decided it had reached "the end of its lifecycle". The show's initial run ended at the conclusion of its tenth series in March 2015.

Waterloo Road Reunited 
A short online spin-off series, Waterloo Road Reunited, was commissioned in 2010 and ran for six episodes the following year. It focuses on the lives of six school leavers who previously appeared in the main show.

Return 

In September 2021, a new series was announced as part of the BBC's intentions to represent all areas of Britain in its programming.

On 6 December 2022, the BBC confirmed that the new series would premiere on 3 January 2023, replacing Holby City in the Tuesday 8pm timeslot, after the show's cancellation in June 2021. It was confirmed that all episodes from the series would release on BBC iPlayer as a boxset on the same day.

Series overview

Episodes

Series 1 (2006)

Series 2 (2007)

Series 3 (2007–2008)

Series 4 (2009)

Series 5 (2009–2010)

Series 6 (2010–2011)

Series 7 (2011–2012)

Series 8 (2012–2013)

Series 9 (2013–2014)

Series 10 (2014–2015)

Series 11 (2023)

Specials

Waterloo Road Reunited

Footnotes

References

External links 
 List of Waterloo Road episodes at BBC Online
 

Waterloo Road
Waterloo Road (TV series)